Matringhem is a commune in the Pas-de-Calais department in the Hauts-de-France region of France.

Geography
Matringhem is situated in the valley of the Lys river, 20 miles (32 km) northeast of Montreuil-sur-Mer, at the D131 and D104 crossroads.

Population

Places of interest
 The church of St.Omer

See also
Communes of the Pas-de-Calais department

References

Communes of Pas-de-Calais